Emily Newton may refer to:

 Emily Newton, a character in the Beethoven film series
 Emily Newton, American soprano who played the title role in the 2013 European premiere of Anna Nicole, an English opera